The 2020–21 USHL season was the 42nd season of the United States Hockey League as an all-junior league.

Due to the onset of the COVID-19 pandemic, the previous season was curtailed on March 12, 2020, without holding a playoff or awarding a Clark Cup champion. As pandemic-related restrictions were still in effect, the start of the 2020–21 season was delayed to November 2020.

During the offseason, the Cedar Rapids RoughRiders' home arena was damaged during the August 10 derecho, forcing the team to suspend operations for at least the 2020–21 season. The Madison Capitols chose to not participate due to pandemic restrictions in Madison, Wisconsin.

The regular season ran from November 6, 2020, to April 24, 2021, with a 54-game schedule for each team. Due to pandemic safety protocols, several games were postponed or cancelled, with six of the fourteen teams completing all 54 games. For the second consecutive season, the Chicago Steel were awarded the Anderson Cup for accumulating 81 points in 54 games for a 0.750 points percentage. The Steel also won the Clark Cup playoff championship.

Regular season
Due to the unbalanced schedule during the COVID-19 pandemic, the league ranked teams on points percentage.

Final standings:

Eastern Conference

Western Conference

x = clinched playoff berth; y = clinched conference title; z = clinched regular season title

Clark Cup playoffs
Final results:

Postseason awards

USHL awards

All-USHL First Team

Source

All-USHL Second Team

Source

All-USHL Third Team

Source

USHL All-Rookie Team

Source

All-Rookie Second Team

Source

References

External links
 Official website of the United States Hockey League

United States Hockey League seasons
USHL